The men's road race T1-2 cycling event at the 2020 Summer Paralympics took place on 2 September 2021, at the Fuji Speedway in Shizuoka Prefecture. 9 riders competed in the event.

The T1–2 classification is for cyclists who have an impairment which affects their balance. They compete with a three-wheeled cycle called a tricycle - three wheels providing more balance than a standard two-wheeled cycle.

Results
The event took place on 2 September 2021 at 13:00:

References

Men's road race T1-2